Premna mollissima, the dusky fire brand mark, is an 8m high small tree in the family Lamiaceae. It is found in India, Bangladesh, and Sri Lanka.

Description
The bark is grey to white in color. Leaves simple, opposite; ovate or elliptic ovate; base rounded; apex acuminate. Bisexual flowers are greenish white in color. Show corymbose cymes inflorescence. Fruit is a black drupe with oblong seeds.

References

mollissima
Flora of China
Flora of tropical Asia